Lukáš Došek (born 12 September 1978) is a Czech former professional footballer who played as a right-back. He played international football for the Czech Republic, making four appearances between 2000 and 2002. He was born in Karlovy Vary. He is the twin brother of Tomáš Došek.

References

External links
 
 
 

Living people
1978 births
Sportspeople from Karlovy Vary
Association football defenders
Czech footballers
Czech Republic under-21 international footballers
Czech Republic international footballers
Olympic footballers of the Czech Republic
Czech First League players
FC Viktoria Plzeň players
SK Slavia Prague players
FC Spartak Trnava players
FC Thun players
Swiss Super League players
Slovak Super Liga players
2. Bundesliga players
Expatriate footballers in Slovakia
Czech twins
Twin sportspeople
Footballers at the 2000 Summer Olympics
Expatriate footballers in Switzerland
Czech expatriate sportspeople in Switzerland
Czech expatriate sportspeople in Slovakia
Expatriate footballers in Germany
Czech expatriate sportspeople in Germany